Withee may refer to:

Mabel Withee (circa 1897-1952), American actress
Niram Withee (1827–1887), American politician
Withee, Wisconsin, a village, United States
Withee (town), Wisconsin, a town, United States